The Cape of Good Hope is a 2004 South African comedy drama film written and produced by Suzanne Kay  and Mark Bamford under the direction of Mark Bamford. It was Mark Bamford's first feature film after his critically praised short, Hero (2001).

The film premiered at the Tribeca Film Festival and the Cannes Film Festival in 2004.

Plot
Afrikaner Kate runs a Cape Town animal shelter, is involved with a married man, and is oblivious to the romantic attentions of Morne, a local veterinarian. The shelter's East Indian receptionist Sharifa is desperately struggling to have a child with her husband. Meanwhile, Congolese handyman Jean Claude finds himself torn between his growing love for a black South African single mother and his dreams of emigrating to Canada.

Cast
Debbie Brown as Kate
Eriq Ebouaney as Jean Claude
Nthati Moshesh as Lindiwe
Morne Visser as Morne
Quanita Adams as Sharifa
David Isaacs as Habib
Kamo Masilo as Thabo
Nick Boraine as Stephen van Heern
Gideon Emery as Miles

Awards
Austin Film Festival, 2004 - Won, Audience award: Best Narrative Feature-Undistributed; Mark Bamford
Austin Film Festival, 2004 - Won, Feature Film Award: Best Narrative Feature; Mark Bamford
National Board of Review, USA, 2005 - Won, Special Recognition: For Excellence on Filmmaking
Image Awards, 2006 - Nominated, Image Award: Outstanding Independent or Foreign Film

External links
 

2004 films
Afrikaans-language films
English-language South African films
Xhosa-language films
Films shot in South Africa
2004 comedy-drama films
Hyperlink films
South African comedy-drama films

Films set in Cape Town